The Taranoan languages are a subgroup of the Cariban language family. The languages are spoken in Brazil, Suriname, and Colombia.

Languages
The Taranoan languages according to Sérgio Meira (2006) are:

Karihona (Carijona)
Akuriyó
Tiriyó

Meira (2006) considers Tiriyó and Akuriyó to be closer to each other than they are to Karihona.

With approximately 2,000 speakers, Tiriyó is the only language that is not close to extinction. Akuriyó and Karihona each have only a few elderly speakers left.

References

Cariban languages